Lara van Niekerk (born 13 May 2003) is a South African competitive swimmer. She is the current African, Commonwealth, and South African record holder in the long course 50-metre breaststroke and the African and South African record holder in the short course 50-metre breaststroke. She won gold medals in the 50-metre breaststroke at the 2018 African Swimming Championships and the 2022 Commonwealth Games as well as a silver medal at the 2022 World Short Course Championships and the bronze medal at the 2022 World Aquatics Championships (long course) in the same event. In the 100-metre breaststroke, she won gold medals at the 2018 African Swimming Championships and the 2022 Commonwealth Games.

Background
Van Niekerk was born 13 May 2003 in South Africa.

Career

2017 African Junior Championships
At the 2017 African Junior Swimming Championships in Cairo, Egypt in March, Van Niekerk won a total of five medals including gold medals in the 100-metre breaststroke, 4×100-metre mixed medley relay, 50-metre breaststroke, 4×100-metre medley relay, and a silver medal in the 200-metre breaststroke.

2018 African Championships

In 2018, at the year's African Swimming Championships in Algiers, Algeria, Van Niekerk won a gold medal in each of the four events she competed. She won her first gold medal in the 200-metre breaststroke with a time of 2:35.25. For her second gold medal, she won the 50-metre breaststroke with a new Championships record time of 31.99 seconds, which broke the former record of 32.06 seconds set by Tilka Paljk of Zambia in the prelims heats. In the 100-metre breaststroke, she won her third gold medal of the Championships, finishing over eight-tenths of a second ahead of the silver medalist in the event with a time of 1:11.13. For her fourth and final event of the Championships, she concluded with another gold medal, this time helping win the 4×100-metre medley relay in 4:12.83, splitting a 1:10.40 for the breaststroke leg of the relay.

2019 World Junior Championships
The following year, Van Niekerk competed in four events at the 2019 World Junior Swimming Championships in Budapest, Hungary, placing fourth in the 50-metre breaststroke with a 31.12, 20th in the 100-metre breaststroke with a 1:10.95, 30th in the 200-metre breaststroke with a 2:36.91, and tenth in 4:15.71 as part of the 4×100-metre medley relay with a split of 1:11.42 for the breaststroke leg of the relay.

2021
At the 2021 South Africa National Short Course Championships in Pietermaritzburg in September, Van Niekerk set two new African and South African records in the short course 50-metre breaststroke, first setting a mark of 30.06 seconds in the prelims heats, then lowering her records to a time of 29.85 seconds in the final. Her swim made her the first South African woman to swim the race in less than 30 seconds. Approximately two months later, she set new African, South African, and Commonwealth records in the long course 50-metre breaststroke with a time of 29.88 seconds at the 2021 Northern Tigers Swimming Championships in Pretoria. With her time of 29.88 seconds, she also became the first South African woman to finish the event faster than 30 seconds and the seventh-fastest female swimmer in the event in history.

2022
Van Niekerk swam faster than 1:07.00 in the long course 100-metre breaststroke twice at the 2022 Grand Prix international meet number two in Durban in February, first swimming a personal best time of 1:06.52 in the preliminary heats, then a 1:06.74 in the final.

2022 South Africa National Championships (LC)
For the 2022 South Africa National Swimming Championships in Gqeberha in April, in part a selection meet to determine the 2022 World Aquatics Championships and 2022 Commonwealth Games South Africa team members, Van Niekerk entered to compete in the 50-metre breaststroke, 50-metre freestyle, 50-metre butterfly, and 100-metre breaststroke. On the first day of competition, 6 April, she set new African, South African, and Commonwealth records in the 50-metre breaststroke, lowering her former mark of 29.88 seconds from 2021 to 29.72 seconds in the prelims heats of the event. The records were ratified by the governing body for aquatic sports in South Africa, Swimming South Africa, on 7 April 2022.

In the final, Van Niekerk placed first in 30.60 seconds, finishing 0.27 seconds ahead of second-place finisher Tatjana Schoenmaker and attaining a qualifying time for both the World Championships and the Commonwealth Games. In the prelims heats of the 50-metre freestyle on day two, she swam a 27.53 in prelims heat six and did not advance to the final in the evening. For the 50-metre butterfly prelims heats on day three, she placed sixth in prelims heat one with a time of 28.57 seconds, not making the top eight across all prelims heats and thus not qualifying for the evening final. On the fourth day, in the prelims heats of the 100-metre breaststroke, she swam a personal best time of 1:06.08 and qualified for the evening final, where she went on to swim a personal best time of 1:05.67 to win the gold medal and achieve a qualifying time for the World Championships and Commonwealth Games. She was named to both the 2022 World Aquatics Championships and 2022 Commonwealth Games teams.

2022 World Aquatics Championships

In her first event of the 2022 World Aquatics Championships, the 100-metre breaststroke, Van Niekerk qualified for the evening semifinals with a time of 1:06.75 and rank of tenth from the preliminaries. She equalled her time of 1:06.75 in the semifinals, this time placing thirteenth and not advancing to the final. In the preliminaries of the 50-metre breaststroke five days later, she ranked first overall with a time of 29.77 seconds and advanced to the semifinals. She finished in a time of 29.99 seconds in the semifinals, qualifying for the final ranking third behind Benedetta Pilato of Italy and Rūta Meilutytė of Lithuania. In the final of the 50-metre breaststroke, she won the first medal for South Africa in any aport at the 2022 World Aquatics Championships, a bronze medal with a time of 29.90 seconds, and continued on the streak of South Africa winning at least one medal at a FINA World Aquatics Championships since 2001.

2022 Commonwealth Games

On the first day of swimming at the 2022 Commonwealth Games, in Birmingham, England starting the month following the World Championships, Van Niekerk ranked first in the preliminaries of the 50-metre breaststroke, setting a new Games record with her time of 29.82 seconds and qualifying for the semifinals. She lowered her Games record to a 29.80 in the semifinals, qualifying for the final ranking first. In the final the following day, she won the gold medal with a Games record time of 29.73 seconds. Her gold medal was the first medal of any kind for South Africa at the 2022 Commonwealth Games in any sport.

Day four, Van Niekerk qualified for the semifinals of the 100-metre breaststroke with a 1:06.40 in the morning preliminaries, which was 0.70 seconds ahead of second-ranked Tatjana Schoenmaker. Swimming under the 1:06.00 threshold for the first time at a Commonwealth Games in the semifinals with a time of 1:05.96, she qualified for the final of the event along with fellow South Africans Tatjana Schoenmaker, who ranked second, and Kaylene Corbett, who ranked seventh. She won the gold medal in the final with a personal best time of 1:05.47. Later in the session, she helped set new African and South African records in the 4×100-metre mixed medley relay in the final, splitting a 1:05.41 to contribute to the new records's time of 3:44.38 and help place fourth. Day six of six, she split a 1:05.56 in the final of the 4×100-metre medley relay, contributing to a fourth-place finish less than two-tenths of a second behind the team from England in a new African and South African record time of 3:59.63.

2022 South Africa National Championships (SC)
At the 2022 South Africa Short Course Championships, held in mid-August in Pietermaritzburg, Van Niekerk set a new African record in the 50-metre breaststroke with a time of 29.62 seconds, which doubled as a qualifying time for the 2022 World Short Course Swimming Championships. Prior to setting the new record and winning the gold medal in the evening final, she set a new record of 29.67 seconds in the morning preliminaries heats. She also achieved a qualifying time, and the national title, in the 200-metre breaststroke with a personal best time of 2:22.75. Earlier in the Championships, she achieved qualifying and personal best times in the 100-metre breaststroke twice, first in the preliminaries heats with a time of 1:04.92, and second in the final of the event with a 1:04.89 to win the gold medal and national title.

2022 World Short Course Championships

On day two of the 2022 World Short Course Championships in December, Van Niekerk ranked second in the preliminaries of the 100 metre breaststroke at the Melbourne Sports and Aquatic Centre with a personal best time of 1:03.93, advancing to the semifinals. For the evening session, she tied for fifth-rank in the semifinals with a time of 1:04.36 and qualified for the final. She placed fifth in the final the following day with a time of 1:04.12. The fifth morning, she ranked third in the preliminaries of the 50 metre breaststroke, setting a new African record with a time of 29.45 seconds and qualifying for the semifinals. In the evening, she lowered the African record to 29.27 seconds and qualified for the final ranking third. She won the first silver medal for South Africa at the competition, and the second silver medal for South Africa in the female event following Penelope Heyns in 1999, in the final, finishing in a new African record time of 29.09 seconds.

International championships (50 m)

International championships (25 m)

Personal best times

Long course metres (50 m pool)

Legend: AF – African record; NR – South African record; CR – Commonwealth record

Short course metres (25 m pool)

Legend: AF – African record; NR – South African record

Continental and national records

Long course metres (50 m pool)

Short course metres (25 m pool)

Awards and honours
 GSport Award, Momentum Athlete of the Year: 2022 (awarded 14 September 2022)
 GSport Award, Global Woman in Sport: 2022 (awarded 14 September 2022)
 GSport Award honour, Ministerial Recognition of Excellence: 2022 (awarded 14 September 2022)
 Gauteng Sport Award finalist, Sportswoman of the Year: 2022 (announced 3 November 2022)
 Gauteng Sport Award finalist, Sport Personality of the Year: 2022 (announced 3 November 2022)
 Swimming World, Female African Swimmer of the Year: 2022 (awarded 24 December 2022)
 Swammy Award, African Female Swimmer of the Year: 2022 (awarded 27 December 2022)

See also
 List of African records in swimming

References

External links
 

2003 births
Living people
South African female swimmers
South African female breaststroke swimmers
Swimmers at the 2022 Commonwealth Games
Commonwealth Games competitors for South Africa
Commonwealth Games gold medallists for South Africa
Commonwealth Games medallists in swimming
Medalists at the FINA World Swimming Championships (25 m)
Female breaststroke swimmers
21st-century South African women
Medallists at the 2022 Commonwealth Games